Spean Sraeng is a khum (commune) of Phnum Srok District in Banteay Meanchey Province in western Cambodia.

Villages

 Rouk
 Mukh Chhneang
 Spean
 Kouk Char
 Kandaol
 Pongro

References

Communes of Banteay Meanchey province
Phnom Srok District